Alexander Mikhailovich Kadakin (22 July 1949 – 26 January 2017) was a Russian diplomat and the Russian Ambassador to India from 2009 until his death in 2017. Kadakin had earlier served as the ambassador to India between 1999 and 2004. He was a noted Indophile. Kadakin died from heart failure while in service in New Delhi in 2017. He was awarded the Padma Bhushan in 2018.

Career
Kadakin was born in Chișinău, USSR to ethnic Russian parents in 1949. He graduated with honours from the Moscow State Institute of International Relations in 1972. He began his diplomatic career as a probationer at the Soviet Embassy in India in August 1971. He then joined the embassy as the third secretary before going on to work at different capacities for the Ministry of Foreign Affairs.

Kadakin served as the translator during Soviet Premier Leonid Brezhnev's official visits to India in the 1970s.

Between 1989 and 1992, he served as the Minister Counselor of the USSR/Russia to India. He was the Russian ambassador to Nepal from 1992 to 1997. His first term as Russian ambassador to India was between 1999 and 2004. He then became the Russian ambassador to Sweden in 2004, and remained in that position till he took over as the ambassador to India for a second term in 2009. He was a member of the Diplomatic Academy of the Ministry of Foreign Affairs of the Russian Federation. He was a recipient of the Order of Friendship in 2016 and the Order of Honour in 2009.

Personal life
Apart from Russian, Kadakin was also fluent in Hindi, English, Urdu, Romanian and French. He was also fond of Bollywood films, and was known to hum classic Bollywood songs of the 1950s.

Death
Kadakin died from heart failure at a hospital in New Delhi on 26 January 2017, India's 68th Republic Day. He was to have attended, as a top diplomat serving in New Delhi, the annual Republic Day parade in New Delhi later that morning.  With a total tenure, in two stints, of over 12 years, he was the longest-serving Russian Ambassador to India and to any nation in the Indian subcontinent. Indian Foreign Ministry spokesperson Vikas Swarup offered condolences saying, "In Kadakin, we lost a valued friend who nurtured India-Russia relationship for many decades as a distinguished Russian diplomat." Prime Minister Narendra Modi also offered his condolences and described Kadakin as a "glorious son of Russia and a great friend of India".

Awards and honours
In a press conference following the 18th India-Russia Annual Summit in Saint Petersburg on 1 June 2017, Prime Minister of India Narendra Modi announced that a road in New Delhi would be named in honour of Kadakin. The following day, the New Delhi Municipal Council (NDMC) passed a resolution officially declaring that the Officers' Mess Road in Chanakyapuri would now be called Alexander M Kadakin Marg. An NDMC official stated that while Kadakin was born in Russia, his "Karma-Bhoomi'' was India.

In January 2018, the Indian third-highest civilian award Padma Bhushan was posthumously conferred upon Kadakin by the President of India.

References

1949 births
2017 deaths
Ambassador Extraordinary and Plenipotentiary (Russian Federation)
Ambassadors of Russia to India
Ambassadors of Russia to Sweden
Ambassadors of Russia to Nepal
Moscow State Institute of International Relations alumni
Recipients of the Padma Bhushan in public affairs